The SEC softball tournament (sometimes known simply as the SEC tournament) is the conference championship tournament in college softball for the Southeastern Conference (SEC). It is a single-elimination (since 2006) tournament and seeding is based on regular season records. The winner receives the conference's automatic bid to the NCAA Division I softball tournament.

Tournament
The SEC softball tournament is a single-elimination tournament held each year at various SEC-conference campus stadiums. 13 of the 14 teams in the SEC make the tournament each year (Vanderbilt does not sponsor a softball team).

History
The tournament has been held since 1997, when the SEC began sponsoring softball. In 1997 it was an eight-team, double-elimination tournament with byes for the top two seeds. From 1998 until 2005 it was an eight-team, double-elimination tournament with no byes. In 2006 it became an eight-team, single-elimination tournament. In 2013, with the addition of Missouri and Texas A&M into the SEC, the tournament moved to a ten-team, single-elimination tournament with the top 6 teams earning first round byes.

Champions

Year-by-year

By school

External links
SECSports.com